RTL+ (formerly TVNOW in German-speaking countries and RTL Most in Hungary) is a European video on demand streaming service belonging to RTL Deutschland and RTL Magyarország, in turn part of the Bertelsmann-owned RTL Group.

History 
Its origins trace back to the launch of the 'RTLnow.de' portal in 2007. In 2016, all the video portals corresponding to the different channels of the TV network merged into TVNOW. From November 4, 2021, the new identity of RTL+ replaced that of TVNOW. At the time, TVNOW was providing a three-layered service (Free, Premium and Premium Duo), having about 2 million paid subscription users, making around 3.4 million users together with Dutch RTL branch Videoland. On February 16, 2022, RTL Deutschland announced a cooperation with the U.S. media company Warner Bros. Discovery. In this context, series and movies from Warner as well as HBO Originals from the streaming provider HBO Max, which is not yet available in Germany, are to be successively integrated into the RTL+ portfolio, in some cases exclusively, starting in the first quarter of 2022. On November 16, 2022, RTL+ was launched in Hungary by RTL Magyarország, replaced that of RTL Most, in order to expand more with Hungarian content online.

References 

Video on demand services
RTL Group